Research Laboratory for Nuclear Reactors (RLNR) (Tokyo Institute of Technology) is a Japanese research laboratory for nuclear reactors.  It was founded in 1956 for the study of nuclear science and its application.

History 
In 1959, the Atomic Science Laboratory, Cockcroft-Walton Accelerator and Atlas Mass Spectrograph were installed in RLNR.

Throughout the 1960s, many research laboratories were added, such as Radio Isotope Laboratory and Nuclear Power Laboratory, and many related buildings were constructed. In 1990 it was reorganised into 3 divisions, Energy Engineering, Mass Transmutation Engineering and System and Safety Engineering. Later the International Nuclear Research Cooperation Centre and Research Cooperation Division were added.

It consists of 10 professors, 1 guest professor, 10 associate professors, 12 assistant professors, 5 technical staff and 4 official staff. Since 2004, at the time when the national universities in Japan were semi-privatised, the purpose of its research has been global energy and environmental problems. The 6 main research fields are Frontier Research on Dispersion-Type Nuclear Energy, Safety and Control of Nuclear Fusion, Utilization of Nuclear Energy with High Efficiency, Safety, Development of Nuclear Frontiers by Accelerators (including studies on environment with ion beams) and Self-consistent Nuclear Energy System (SCNES).

Notes 

Tokyo Institute of Technology